Barry was a parliamentary constituency in Glamorgan (later South Glamorgan), Wales which returned one Member of Parliament (MP)  to the House of Commons of the Parliament of the United Kingdom, elected by the first past the post voting system.

The constituency was created for the 1950 general election, and abolished for the 1983 general election. The majority of the electorate (61%) passed to the new Vale of Glamorgan constituency where they formed a majority (76.8%) of this seat. The district of Penarth which formed 23.6% of the constituency joined the majority of the Cardiff SE seat to form the new Cardiff South and Penarth.

Boundaries
1950–1955: The Borough of Barry, and the Rural District of Cardiff.

1955–1974: The Borough of Barry, and the Rural District of Cardiff except the parts of the parishes of Lisvane and Radyr added to the County Borough of Cardiff by the Cardiff Extension Act 1950.

1974–1983: The Borough of Barry, the Urban District of Penarth, and the Rural District of Cardiff except the parish of Van.

Members of Parliament

Elections

Elections in the 1950s

Elections in the 1960s

Elections in the 1970s

References

Barry, Vale of Glamorgan
History of Glamorgan
Historic parliamentary constituencies in South Wales
Politics of the Vale of Glamorgan
Constituencies of the Parliament of the United Kingdom established in 1950
Constituencies of the Parliament of the United Kingdom disestablished in 1983
Politics of Glamorgan